The 2018–19 Alabama Crimson Tide women's basketball team represents the University of Alabama in the 2018–19 NCAA Division I women's basketball season. The Crimson Tide, led by sixth-year head coach Kristy Curry, play their games at Coleman Coliseum and were members of the Southeastern Conference. They finished the season 14–17, 5–11 in SEC play to finish in eleventh place. They defeated Vanderbilt in the first round of the SEC women's tournament before losing to Auburn in the second round.

Previous season
The Crimson Tide finished the 2017–18 season 20–14, 7–9 in SEC play to finish in eighth place. They lost in the second round of the SEC women's tournament to Kentucky. They received an automatic bid to the Women's National Invitation Tournament and defeated Southern, UCF and Georgia Tech in the first, second and third rounds, before losing to Virginia Tech in the quarterfinals.

Roster

Schedule

|-
!colspan=6 style=| Exhibition

|-
!colspan=6 style=| Non-conference regular season

|-
!colspan=6 style=| SEC regular season

|-
!colspan=9 style=| SEC Women's Tournament

Source:

Rankings
2018–19 NCAA Division I women's basketball rankings

References

Alabama
Alabama Crimson Tide women's basketball seasons
Alabama Crimson Tide
Alabama Crimson Tide